Indian Institute of Legal Studies is a law college in Dagapur,  Siliguri, West Bengal. It was established in the year 2009. The college is affiliated to University of North Bengal. This college is also approved by the Bar Council of India.

It has other campus at Cooch behar affiliated with Cooch Behar Panchanan Barma University.

Courses 
The campus of Siliguri offers five-years integrated B.A.LL.B., B.Com.LL.B., B.B.A.LL.B.,three-years LL.B., 2 year LLM and MA in public administration and governance.The campus of Coochbehar offers 5 yrs integrated B.A.LL.B and 3 yrs LL.B.

See also

References

External links 
 https://www.iilsindia.com/
University of North Bengal
University Grants Commission
National Assessment and Accreditation Council

Law schools in West Bengal
Universities and colleges in Darjeeling district
Colleges affiliated to University of North Bengal
Educational institutions established in 2009
2009 establishments in West Bengal